"Flames" is a song recorded by British singer-songwriter SG Lewis featuring Australian singer-songwriter Ruel. The song was released on 10 May 2019 as the third and final single from his Lewis's fifth extended play Dawn. In a press release, Lewis said "I was put on to Ruel's music about 18 months ago, and watching his growth since then has been amazing. He's got such soul to his voice for someone of his age, it's crazy."

The music video for "Flames" was released on 30 May 2019.

Reception
Kat Bein from Billboard said "'Flames' is smooth and funky, with a slow-jam melody that wafts over a menacing, '80s-style synth rhythm. There are bright moments of almost hymnal quality at the pre-chorus, but the fiery elements lick back up the sides to slow burn the vibe.

Juliette Stuart from Coup de Main Magazine said "The track is chill yet remains upbeat and maiden with synths it manages to be funky yet calm."

RJ Frometa from Vents Magazine called the song "a sure fire song of the summer with Ruel's soulful vocals dancing atop SG's layered production".

Alissa Arunarsirakul from Ones to Watch called the song "electrifying" saying "'Flames' incorporates Ruel's tender vocals and Lewis' warm electronics that remind us of peaceful sunrises after a night of good fun and treasured memories."

Track listing
Digital download 
 "Flames" – 3:33

Digital download 
 "Flames" (Lastlings remix) – 4:18

Charts

Release history

References

 

2019 singles
2019 songs
SG Lewis songs
Ruel (singer) songs
Song recordings produced by SG Lewis
Songs written by Frances (musician)
Songs written by SG Lewis
Virgin EMI Records singles